The Civil List Act 1697 was an Act of the Parliament of England (9 Will III c. 23). This was the first Act of Parliament to set the Civil List, although the custom had begun in 1689. The annual amount assigned to King William III and his household was £700,000, an amount that did not change until the beginning of the reign of George III in 1760.

References

1697 in law
1697 in England
Acts of the Parliament of England